Zaonikiyevo is a rural locality (a passing loop) in Prilukskoye Rural Settlement, Vologodsky District, Vologda Oblast, Russia. The population was 3 as of 2002.

Geography 
Zaonikiyevo is located 14 km north of Vologda (the district's administrative centre) by road. Semenkovo-2 is the nearest rural locality.

References 

Rural localities in Vologodsky District